Lennoxia is a genus of diatoms belonging to the family Cymatosiraceae.

The species of this genus are found in Europe and Northern America.

Species:
 Lennoxia faveolata H.A.Thomsen & K.R.Buck, 1993

References

Cymatosirales
Diatom genera